Kizilyaka can refer to:

 Kızılyaka, Altınyayla
 Kızılyaka, Çameli